The  was the first museum of meteorology in Japan. It is located in Ebayama Park in the city of Hiroshima, Hiroshima Prefecture, Japan.

History
 Opened as the Japanese first Prefecutal meteorological observatory in Kako-machi, Hiroshima, Aki, Hiroshima on January 1, 1879.
 Moved to Kokutaiji-machi, Hiroshima, Aki, Horoshima on December 31, 1892.
 New building was completed in Eba-machi, Hiroshima in 1934.
 Moved to the new building on January 1, 1935.
 Nationalized as the Hiroshima weather station of the Central Meteorological Observatory of the Ministry of Education on November 1, 1939.
 Renewed as the Hiroshima Meteorological Observatory of the Ministry of Transport in November 1943.
 Suffered from the A-bomb, lost staff and instruments but continued the observation on August 6, 1945.
 Renamed as the Hiroshima District Meteorological Observatory on August 11, 1945.
 Suffered great damage from the Makurazaki Typhoon on September 17, 1945.
 Renamed sa the Hiroshima Local Meteorological Observatory on November 1, 1949.
 The competent authorities was changed to the Meteorological Agency on July 1, 1956.
 The Hiroshima Local Meteorological Observatory was moved to Kami-hachobori, Naka-ku, Hiroshima on December 22, 1987.
 The building was placed under the Hiroshima City to preserve on November 1, 1990.
 The building was reborn as the first Museum of Meteorology in Japan on June 1, 1992.
 The building was designated as an important cultural asset by Hiroshima City on July 25, 2000.
 Started the weather forecast for Hiroshima city area on July 20, 2003.

Museum

Permanent exhibitions
 Study tour of the weather forecast
 search the weather information through the internet
 Videos
 Instruments for the weather observation
 Experiment services of the weather
 Wind capsule
 Laboratories of Franklin
 Consultations about the weather

Special exhibitions

Education programs
 Science show
 Delivery services of the science show
 Science workshop
 Natural science
 Science volunteer activities
 Internship system
 Weekly mail magazine

Museum shop

Modern cultural heritage
 Prewar style building
 Windows with the shorter side at the top
 Side belt and other parts of the wall with uneven decoration
 Simple geometric design
 Thin eaves of the porch
 Original design of the capitals
 Time consumed interior decorations
 photos

A-bombed building
 Preserved the A-bombed wall
 Bent window frame by the bomb blast
 The wall with the stuck grass
 photos

Access
 Hiroden Eba-sakae-machi bus stop
 Hiroden Eba Station

See also
 Atomic Bombing - August 6, 1945
 Makurazaki Typhoon - September 17, 1945
 one of the three largest Typhoons of the Shōwa era
 1229 dead, 1054 injured, 783 missing in Hiroshima Prefecture
 A Blank in the Weather Map
 Non-fiction book about the Hiroshima Meteorological Observatory in 1945
 written by Kunio Yanagida
 Hiroshima Witness

References

External links
 Hiroshima City Ebayama Museum of Meteorology
 Hiroshima City Ebayama Museum of Meteorology
 Hiroshima City Ebayama Museum of Meteorology @ architecture in Hiroshima
 Record the day of A-bomb by the Campbell–Stokes Sunshine Recorder
 Location from Google Maps

Museums established in 1879
1879 establishments in Japan
Monuments and memorials in Japan
Museums in Hiroshima
Natural history museums in Japan
Science museums in Japan
History museums in Japan
Ebayama